The Register of Cultural Goods of the Republic of Croatia has been established in 1999. The Croatian Ministry of Culture is responsible for the administration of this public register, which has been created according to the Act on the protection and preservation of cultural goods of 1999 (Croatian Zakon o zaštiti i očuvanju kulturnih dobara) (art. 14, OG 69/99). The register is a comprehensive list of all cultural monuments under national protection.

Lists

The register contains the following specialized lists:

 List of protected cultural goods (Lista zaštićenih kulturnih dobara)
 List of cultural goods of national significance (Lista kulturnih dobara nacionalnog značenja)
 List of preventively protected goods (Lista preventivno zaštićenih dobara)

Constitution

The Croatian constitution stipulates that the protection of cultural goods, as well as their use needs to be regulated according to the constitution and laws of the Republic of Croatia (art. 2).

The constitution further stipulates:

Article 52

The sea, the coast and islands, waters, airspace, mining resources and other natural treasures, but also land property, woods, plants and animals, other parts of nature, immovable property and items of particular cultural, historic, economic and ecologic significance, which are of interest for the Republic of Croatia according to law, have its particular protection.

More, morska obala i otoci, vode, zračni prostor, rudno blago i druga prirodna bogatstva, ali i zemljište, šume, biljni i životinjski svijet, drugi dijelovi prirode, nekretnine i stvari od osobitog kulturnoga, povijesnog, gospodarskog i ekološkog značenja, za koje je zakonom određeno da su od interesa za Republiku Hrvatsku, imaju njezinu osobitu zaštitu.

A few examples

According to the Act on the protection and preservation of cultural goods, the Croatian Ministry of Culture regularly publishes registry changes.

A few examples of protected national monuments:

 Episcopal Complex of the Euphrasian Basilica in the Historic Centre of Poreč
 Old City of Dubrovnik
 Fortress Nehaj in Senj
 Trakošćan Castle
 Zagreb Cathedral
 Cathedral of St. James in Šibenik
 Cathedral of St. Lawrence in Trogir
 Zrinski Castle in Čakovec

Intangible Cultural Heritage in Croatia

According to the UNESCO Intangible Heritage Lists, the Croatian Intangible Cultural Heritage is particularly rich. , 14 Intangible Cultural Heritages have been added to the UNESCO list:

 Annual carnival bell ringers’ pageant from the Kastav area
 Gingerbread craft from northern Croatia - Licitar
 Ojkanje singing
 Lacemaking in Croatia
 Procession Za Križen (Following the Cross) on the island of Hvar
 The Sinjska alka, a knights' tournament in Sinj
 Spring procession of Ljelje/Kraljice (queens) from Gorjani
 Festivity of Saint Blaise, patron saint of Dubrovnik
 Traditional manufacturing of Children's Wooden Toys in Hrvatsko Zagorje
 Two-part singing and playing in the Istrian scale
 Bećarac singing and playing from Eastern Croatia
 Nijemo Kolo, silent circle dance of the Dalmatian hinterland
 Klapa multipart singing of Dalmatia, southern Croatia
 Mediterranean diet, shared with Cyprus, Spain, Greece, Italy, Morocco, and Portugal

The Republic of Croatia has so far entered 65 elements of intangible cultural heritage in the national Registry.

See also
 Art of Croatia
 Culture of Croatia
 World Heritage Sites in Croatia

References

External links

 Croatian Ministry of Culture (Ministarstvo kulture Republike Hrvatske)
 Register of Cultural Goods of Croatia Website
 Register of Cultural Goods of Croatia Database
 Croatian Cultural Heritage Web Portal and Database

 
Heritage registers in Croatia
1999 establishments in Croatia
Historic sites in Croatia